Girls in Love may refer to:

 Girls in Love (novel), a novel by Jacqueline Wilson
 Girls in Love (TV series), a British teen drama series, based on the novel